Erwin Raphael McManus (born August 28, 1958) is an author, futurist, filmmaker, and fashion designer. He is the lead pastor of Mosaic, a megachurch based in Los Angeles. Erwin is a speaker on issues related to postmodernism and postmodern Christianity, and also writes and lectures on culture, identity, change, and other topics.

Personal life

Born Irving Rafael Mesa-Cardona, in San Salvador, El Salvador, McManus was raised by his grandparents for the first years of his life. McManus, along with his brother Alex, immigrated to the United States when he was young, joining his mother. He grew up on the east coast – primarily in Miami, Florida, but also in Queens, NY and Raleigh, NC.

The name McManus comes from his mother's second marriage. McManus was not a legal name, but his stepfather's alias and later was legalized by McManus in adulthood.

McManus originally studied philosophy at Elon University, before transferring to and graduating, with a B.A., from the University of North Carolina at Chapel Hill. He later obtained his M.Div. from Southwestern Baptist Theological Seminary in Fort Worth, Texas. McManus also received a Doctorate in Humane Letters, an honorary degree, from Southeastern University in Lakeland, Florida.

He and his wife Kim have three children.

Christian minister
While working on his master's degree in Dallas/Fort Worth, McManus began two congregations while serving among the urban poor.

He became the Metropolitan Consultant and City Strategist for the city of Dallas and served in that role as a Futurist and Urbanologist from 1990 to 1993.

He moved with his family to Los Angeles in 1993 and became senior pastor of The Church on Brady in East Los Angeles. He later changed the name to Mosaic. Since the 1990s, McManus has been associated with the Leadership Network. In addition, he partners with Bethel Seminary as a lecturer and futurist.

As lead pastor of Mosaic, McManus speaks in multiple Sunday gatherings in Hollywood, California. Mosaic has opened multiple campuses, including Hollywood, Venice, Pasadena, Orange County, and Seattle.

McManus has used psychological personality metrics in his church, such as the Myers-Briggs type indicator and Gallup's Strengths Finder. He is currently an advisor with the Awaken Group, a transformation design company.

Motivational speaker 

McManus is a motivational speaker, having been paid by Fortune 100, Fortune 500, and companies such as Nike, HYPEBEAST, Sony, Fox News, Apple, Liberty University, and TED. He speaks on topics like reinventing organizations, culture, community, equality, humanity, leadership, general motivation, futuristic ideas, inspiration, and spirituality.

He is paid between $20,000 to $30,000 per public speaking engagement.

Controversies

Stance on LGBTQ and human equality 
On May 28, 2019, McManus in HYPEBEAST said that the church he is the senior pastor and CEO of, Mosaic, are inclusive to the gay (LGBTQ) community."I don’t have data on this, but I'm going to guess that we probably have more people who identify themselves in the gay community at Mosaic" he adds. "And so our posture has always been we're for everybody."On June 25, 2019, the writer of the article, Emily Jensen, updated it after several verified ex-Mosaic staff members claimed that McManus's position on the LGBTQ community is false, and that he and the church itself are anti-LGBTQ. They also claimed that McManus leadership training spoke less of women, treated the homeless poorly, and do not allow LGBTQ members to be in church leadership positions.

McManus responded by saying, "To be clear anyone and everyone is welcome at Mosaic. Mosaic is one of the most diverse communities that exists. There are currently many people of varied race, color, ethnicity, economic status, sexual orientation, and religious beliefs who attend Mosaic."

Author
McManus has written thirteen books:

 An Unstoppable Force: Daring to Become the Church God Had in Mind (June 1, 2001)
 Uprising: A Revolution of the Soul (September 4, 2003)
 The Church in Emerging Culture: Five Perspectives (October 1, 2003) Este libro no es de MacManus, sino de Michael Horton.
 The Barbarian Way: Unleash the Untamed Faith Within (February 10, 2005)
 Chasing Daylight: Seize the Power of Every Moment (January 10, 2006)
 Stand Against the Wind: Fuel for the Revolution of Your Soul (February 14, 2006)
 Seizing Your Divine Moment (June 30, 2006)
 Soul Cravings (November 14, 2006)
 Wide Awake (July 1, 2008)
 The Artisan Soul: Crafting Your Life Into A Work Of Art (February 25, 2014)
 The Last Arrow: Save Nothing for the Next Life (September 5, 2017)
 The Way of the Warrior: An Ancient Path to Inner Peace (February 26, 2019)
 The Genius of Jesus: The Man Who Changed Everything (September 14, 2021)

Fashion designer, filmmaker and TV personality

Since 2004, McManus has worked as a filmmaker in multiple roles. McManus started and owned companies in both the fashion industry and film industry.

In 2013 McManus Studios and McManus shut down after investors pulled funding from the failing business. McManus took out loans to pay employees and finish contracted projects.

In 2020, McManus launched a TV Show called McManus on Trinity Broadcasting Network's Hillsong Channel with his son Aaron McManus. The show includes a group of millennials discussing the "hottest, hardest topics" and current events.

Selected filmography

References

External links
 
 McManus Fashion Gallery
 

1958 births
People from Los Angeles
Christian writers
Futurologists
Living people
Promise Keepers
Emerging church movement
Salvadoran emigrants to the United States
20th-century Baptist ministers from the United States
21st-century Baptist ministers from the United States
American evangelists
Writers from Los Angeles
Urban planning